No More Heroes is the second studio album by English new wave band the Stranglers. It was released on 23 September 1977, through record label United Artists in most of the world and A&M in the United States, five months after their debut album, Rattus Norvegicus.

Background
No More Heroes was produced by Martin Rushent. The album consists of new material with four songs left over from the Rattus Norvegicus sessions ("Something Better Change", "Bitching", "Peasant in the Big Shitty" and "School Mam").

The album cover features a photo of a wreath placed on a coffin with the tails of several rats (the Stranglers' trademark). The brass plaque on the album cover was engraved by Steven Stapleton of Nurse with Wound.

Two singles were released from the album: "No More Heroes", and a double A-side of "Something Better Change" and the non-album track "Straighten Out".

Critical reception

No More Heroes has been praised by retrospective critics. AllMusic called No More Heroes "faster, nastier and better [than Rattus Norvegicus]. "At this point the Stranglers were on top of their game, and the ferocity and anger that suffuses this record would never be repeated." Trouser Press wrote that No More Heroes "continues in the same vein [as Rattus Norvegicus], but drops whatever hint of restraint may have been in force the first time around. Rude words and adult themes abound, with no punches pulled, from the blatant sexism of "Bring on the Nubiles" to the sarcastic attack on racism ("I Feel Like a Wog") to the suicide of a friend ("Dagenham Dave"). Despite the increased virulence, the music is even better than on the debut, introducing pop stylings that would later become a more common aspect of the Stranglers' character," finishing the review with "No More Heroes is easily [the Stranglers'] best album."

In 2000 it was voted number 427 in Colin Larkin's All Time Top 1000 Albums.

Track listing

1987 CD reissue bonus track (EMI)

1996 CD reissue bonus disc (EMI)
Disc one as per original album 

2018 CD reissue bonus tracks (Parlophone)

Charts and certifications

Weekly charts

Year-end charts

Singles

Personnel

 The Stranglers
 Hugh Cornwell – guitars, lead and backing vocals
 Jean-Jacques Burnel –  bass guitar, lead and backing vocals
 Dave Greenfield – keyboards (Hammond L100 Organ, Hohner Cembalet electric piano, Minimoog synthesizer), lead and backing vocals
 Jet Black – drums, percussion

 Technical personnel
 Martin Rushent – production
 Alan Winstanley – engineering
 Nigel Brooke-Harte – mixing, engineering assistance
 Doug Bennett – mixing
 JONZ (John Dent) – mastering
 Paul Henry – sleeve design, art direction
 Trevor Rogers – sleeve photography
 Eamonn O'Keefe – sleeve photography solarisation
 The Red Room – artwork design (2001 reissue)

References

External links
 

The Stranglers albums
Albums produced by Martin Rushent
1977 albums
United Artists Records albums
A&M Records albums
Post-punk albums by English artists